Somalia is the home of Al-Shabaab, an internationally cited terrorist organization
with ties to foreign nations. Several individuals have been sought for questioning and are pending arrests.

References 

Most wanted lists
Terrorism-related lists
Most wanted suspected terrorists